In management, business value is an informal term that includes all forms of value that determine the health and well-being of the firm in the long run. Business value expands concept of value of the firm beyond economic value (also known as economic profit, economic value added, and shareholder value) to include other forms of value such as employee value, customer value, supplier value, channel partner value, alliance partner value, managerial value, and societal value. Many of these forms of value are not directly measured in monetary terms.

Business value often embraces intangible assets not necessarily attributable to any stakeholder group. Examples include intellectual capital and a firm's business model. The balanced scorecard methodology is one of the most popular methods for measuring and managing business value.
See Business valuation.

Philosophy

The concept of business value aligned with the theory that a firm is best viewed as a network of relationships both internal and external. These networks are sometimes called a value network.  Each node in the network could be a stakeholder group, a resource, an organization, end-consumers, interest groups, regulators, or the environment itself. In a value network, value creation is viewed as a collaborative, creative, synergistic process rather than purely mechanistic or a result of command-and-control.

If the firm is viewed as a network of value creating entities, then the question becomes how does each node in the network contribute to overall firm performance and how does it behave and respond to its own interests.  When the nodes are independent organizations (e.g., suppliers) or agents (e.g., customers), it is assumed that the firm is seeking a cooperative, win-win relationship where all parties receive value. Even when nodes in the network are not fully independent (e.g., employees), it is assumed that incentives are important and that those incentives go beyond direct financial compensation.

While it would be very desirable to translate all forms of business value to a single economic measure (e.g., discounted cash flow), many practitioners and theorists believe this is either not feasible or theoretically impossible. Therefore, advocates of business value believe that the best approach is to measure and manage multiple forms of value as they apply to each stakeholder group.

As yet, there are no well-formed theories about how the various elements of business value are related to each other and how they might contribute to the firm's long-term success. One promising approach is the business model, but these are rarely formalized.

History

Peter Drucker was an early proponent of business value as the proper goal of a firm, especially that a firm should create value for customers, employees (especially knowledge workers), and distribution partners. His management by objectives was a goal setting and decision-making tool to help managers at all levels create business value.  However, he was skeptical that the dynamics of business value could ever be formalized, at least not with current methods.

Michael Porter popularized the concept of the value chain.

Components

Shareholder value
For a publicly traded company, shareholder value is the part of its capitalization that is equity as opposed to long-term debt. In the case of only one type of stock, this would roughly be the number of outstanding shares times current share price. Things like dividends augment shareholder value while issuing of shares (stock options) lower it.
This shareholder value added should be compared to average/required increase in value, also known as cost of capital.

For a privately held company, the value of the firm after debt must be estimated using one of several valuation methods, such as discounted cash flow or others.

Customer value
Customer value is the value received by the end-customer of a product or service. End-customer can include a single individual (consumer) or an organization with various individuals playing different roles in the buying-consumption processes. Customer value is conceived variously as utility, quality, benefits, and customer satisfaction.

Employee knowledge
This is often an undervalued asset in companies and also the area where there is the most discord in reporting. Employees are the most valuable asset companies possess and the one we expect the most from, but often the one that receives the short end of the stick when it comes to values applied to them.

Channel partner value
The value a business underpins on partner relationships in the business. Partner value here stresses that it can be critical to a firms functioning. It ceases to exist or carry out business activities if partner value is diminished or lost.

Strategies for creating business value
An increase or decline in business value that an action produces is traditionally measured in terms of customer satisfaction, revenue growth, profitability, market share, wallet share, cross-sell ratio, marketing campaign response rates, or relationship duration.

Business value of information technology
Various factors affect the business value impact of information technology (IT). The most important factor is the alignment between IT and business processes, organization structure, and strategy. At the highest levels, this alignment is achieved through proper integration of enterprise architecture, business architecture, process design, organization design, and performance metrics.

At the level of computing and communications infrastructure, the following performance factors constrain and partially determine IT capabilities:
 Usability
 Functionality
 Availability
 Reliability, recoverability
 Performance (throughput, response time, predictability, capacity, etc.)
 Security
 Agility

The term value-driven design was devised to describe the approach to planning business change (especially systems) based on the incremental improvements to business value - this is seen clearly in agile software development, where the goals of each iteration of product delivery are prioritised on what delivers highest business value drives.

Criticisms

Business value is an informal concept and there is no consensus, either in academic circles or among management professionals, on its meaning or on its role in effective decision-making. The term could even be described as a "buzz word" used by various consultants, analyst firms, executives, authors, and academics.

Some critics believe that measuring economic value, economic profit, or shareholder value is sufficiently complete to guide decision-making.  They regard all other forms of value as essentially intermediate to the ultimate goal of economic profit. Furthermore, if they do not contribute to economic profit, they are actually a distraction for the firm.

Other critics believe that extensive efforts to measure business value will be more of a distraction than a boon. For example, there is a fear that decision-makers will become confused if they have too many goals and measures that need to be accommodated.

See also
 Customer value
 Economic profit
 Shareholder value
 Utility

References

Financial management
Organizational theory
Financial economics